Mohave Community College (MCC) is a public community college with campuses in Kingman, Lake Havasu City, Bullhead City, and Colorado City, serving Mohave County, Arizona and the surrounding communities.  MCC is accredited by the Higher Learning Commission.

History

In October 1970, a public vote established MCC as a county college and elected its first board of governors. The board planned to have three campuses (in Kingman, Bullhead City and Lake Havasu City), later expanding to Colorado City. In June 1971, J. Leonard and Grace Neal donated 160 acres of land north of Kingman where the college’s first facilities were developed, and in October 1972, McCulloch Properties donated a parcel of land located in Lake Havasu City. The college became part of the Arizona State System of Community Colleges in 1974, and received full accreditation from the North Central Association of Colleges and Schools in 1981.

Academics
In the early 1970s, MCC's courses were offered at night and were occupational in nature.  In 1981, the college started offering nursing classes  and was accredited in 1982 – eventually partnering with Allied Health.  In the late 1980s, MCC became the primary provider of Adult Education/GED program services in Mohave County.

MCC’s programs expanded to include Business, Culinary Arts, Computer Information Systems, Education, Engineering, Industrial Technology, Liberal Arts & Sciences, and Public Safety & Legal Studies.  Recently, the school welding program has grown significantly and met national standards.

MCC also has a long history of distance education.  In the late 1980s MCC began delivering instruction by videotape and connected the campuses by telecommunication links.  Presently, the school utilizes online classes and smartboard technology for distance education.

Enrollment and demographics
Enrollment at MCC has increased since its founding in 1981.  In 2008, Mohave Community College placed 24th nationally among community colleges in enrollment growth. As of 2011 it had 1,707 full-time students and 4,400 part-time students on all campuses, with 64% being female and 75% being non-Hispanic white.

References

External links

Community colleges in Arizona
Buildings and structures in Mohave County, Arizona
Education in Mohave County, Arizona